The 1919 VFL Grand Final was an Australian rules football game contested between the Collingwood Football Club and Richmond Football Club, held at the Melbourne Cricket Ground in Melbourne on 11 October 1919. It was the 22nd annual Grand Final of the Victorian Football League, staged to determine the premiers for the 1919 VFL season. The match, attended by 45,413 spectators, was won by Collingwood by a margin of 25 points, marking that club's fifth premiership victory.

Teams

 Umpire - Jack Elder

Statistics

Goalkickers

References
AFL Tables: 1919 Grand Final

See also
 1919 VFL season

VFL/AFL Grand Finals
Grand
Collingwood Football Club
Richmond Football Club
October 1919 sports events